"You're Beautiful" is a 2005 single by James Blunt.

You're Beautiful or You Are Beautiful may also refer to:

 You're Beautiful (TV series), a South Korean television drama
 "You're Beautiful" (Nathaniel Willemse song), 2014
 "You're Beautiful", a 1971 song by Roger Whittaker from The Last Farewell
 "You're Beautiful", a 2011 song by Taio Cruz from TY.O
 "You Are Beautiful", a phrase spelt out on 108 North State Street
 "You Are Beautiful", a Rodgers and Hammerstein song from the 1958 musical Flower Drum Song